NGJ may refer to:

New Games Journalism, a model of New Journalism applied to video game journalism in which personal anecdotes, references to other media, and creative analyses are used to explore game design, play, and culture 
Next Generation Jammer, a program to develop an airborne electronic warfare system, as a replacement for the AN/ALQ-99 found on the EA-18G military aircraft
No Greater Joy, a U.S. 501(c)(3) non-profit ministry of Michael and Debi Pearl established to train parents in effective parenting based on the Bible
Nordic Game Jam, an annual game jam that takes place in Copenhagen